Tuwon masara is a corn flour swallow eaten in the northern part of Nigeria.

Etymology 
The term tuwon masara is formed from two Hausa words: tuwo (cooked cornmeal) and masara (maize). Tuwon masara is  similar to sadza, a popular Southern African food. In Ghana, tuwon masara is called and eaten as Tuwo Zafi. It's one of the most popular food in northern Nigeria.''

Preparation 
To prepare tuwon masara, you must first let your maize dry and afterwards grind it. You grind it to powder,
Boil your water and then pour in the maize fine particles, i.e after you mix your maize powder with cold water, stir and leave it for five minutes which is called talge, add more maize powder to the talge stir until it becomes like a firm dough.

Usage 
Tuwon Masara can be eaten with different types of soup, examples of which are: miyar Taushe (Vegetable soup), Miyar Kuka (baobab soup), Miyar Kubewa (Okra soup), Miyar agushi (Melon soup) etc.

References

Nigerian cuisine
Maize dishes
Swallows (food)
Hausa
Africa